Feel Ghood Music is a South Korean record label and entertainment agency founded by Tiger JK in 2013.

History 
Originally created in July 2013 by MFBTY to house the new group and their members (Tiger JK, Yoon Mi-rae, and Bizzy) the company Feel Ghood Music was named after Tiger JK's 8th album, Feel gHood Muzik : The 8th Wonder.

Throughout the years Feel Ghood Music has signed other artists like Junoflo, Black Nine, and MRSHLL focusing on supporting their musical expression and creating a healthy environment.

Artists

Groups 
 MFBTY
 Drunken Tiger

Soloists 
 Tiger JK
 Bizzy
 Yoon Mi-rae
 Junoflo (2016-2019)
 Ann One
 MRSHLL
 Black Nine
 Bibi

Discography

External links 
 Official website

References 

South Korean record labels
Talent agencies of South Korea
South Korean hip hop record labels
Record labels established in 2013